Flatline is the sixth album by MC Breed. It was released on September 23, 1997, for Wrap Records, and was produced by MC Breed, Jazze Pha, Ant Banks, The D.O.C., Preston Crump and Erotic D. The album peaked at No. 48 on the Billboard Top R&B/Hip-Hop Albums chart. It was Breed's last album for Wrap Records.

Track listing
"Floatin' Through the Cosmos"- 4:26 
"My Dove"- 4:59 
"Dreamin'"- 4:55 
"Guerrilla Pimpin'"- 4:39 (featuring The D.O.C.) 
"Rule No. 1"- 3:55 (featuring Pimp C, Kurupt & DFC)
"Café Interlude"- 2:05 
"Conclusions"- 5:35 (featuring Too Short)
"Lakeside Lude"- 1:21 
"Dear Lord"- 3:50 
"Whatcha Mad At?"- 4:03 
"Flatline"- 2:58 
"Duece Shot"- 3:53 (featuring Erotic D) 
"Break of Dawn"- 4:20

References

1998 albums
MC Breed albums
Albums produced by Jazze Pha